Heavatar is a German power metal band.

History 
Heavatar was founded in 2012 by Van Canto founder Stefan Schmidt as a project. The debut album, All My Kingdoms, was released in February 2013 via Napalm Records. Jörg Michael acts as the drummer on this album. The project also features guitarist Sebastian Scharf and bassist David Vogt. Stefan Schmidt himself plays the seven-string guitar and does the lead vocals. Hacky Hackman and Olaf Senkbeil, who were already working together with Blind Guardian, were responsible for the choral arrangements. The cover artwork was done by the fantasy artist Kerem Beyit.

Musical style 
The band's music contains classical motifs, from composers like Bach, Beethoven and Paganini, and embeds it into power metal compositions.

Band members 
 Stefan Schmidt – rhythm guitar, lead vocals
 Sebastian Scharf – lead guitar
 David Vogt – bass guitar
 Jörg Michael – drums

Discography 
 2013: All My Kingdoms (Napalm Records)
 2018: The Annihilation (earMusic)

See also 
 Van Canto
 In Legend

References

External links 
 

German power metal musical groups
Musical groups established in 2012
2012 establishments in Germany
Napalm Records artists